Uganda Revenue Authority Football Club is a Ugandan football team based in Kampala. The club plays in the Ugandan Premier League and was founded in 1997. They have won the Ugandan Premier League four times and the Uganda Cup three times.

History
URA merged with Lyantonde FC in 2001. URA had been excluded from the Western League. Lyantonde, cup finalists in 2000, did not raise enough money to continue playing in the Buganda Super mini-league. The parties agreed URA would pay the registration fee and take over Lyantonde's place in the league. After promotion, the team took the URA name and began play in the Buganda mini-league.

The club's first season in the top flight was 2002. They have been one of the most successful teams in the league since their promotion, having never finished in the bottom half of the table.

Honors
Uganda Premier LeagueWinners (4): 2006, 2006–07, 2008–09, 2010–11Runners-up: 2012–13
Uganda CupWinners (3): 2005, 2011–12, 2013–14Runners-up: 2000, 2008–09, 2010–11
Kagame Interclub CupRunners-up: 2007, 2008

Continental Competition
 2006 CAF Confederation Cup
Preliminary round: beat World Hope 2–1 on aggregate
Round of 32: lost to Al-Merrikh 3–2 on aggregate
 2007 CAF Champions League
Preliminary round: lost to Coton Sport 3–0 on aggregate
 2008 CAF Champions League
Preliminary round: lost to ZESCO United 2–0 on aggregate
 2010 CAF Champions League
Preliminary round: lost to Zanaco FC 4–1 on aggregate
 2012 CAF Champions League
Preliminary round: beat Lesotho Correctional Services 3–0 on aggregate
First round: lost on walkover to Djoliba AC after not traveling to Mali due to 2012 Malian coup d'état; lost first leg 2–0
 2013 CAF Champions League
Preliminary round: lost to Coton Sport on penalties
 2015 CAF Confederation Cup
Preliminary round: beat ASSM Elgeco Plus 4–2 on aggregate
First round: lost to Orlando Pirates 4–3 on aggregate

Current squad

References

External links
 

Football clubs in Uganda
Association football clubs established in 1997
Sport in Kampala
1997 establishments in Uganda
Financial services association football clubs